Paul Joseph "Skinny" Dashiell (July 16, 1867 – July 6, 1937) was an American football player, coach, and university professor.  He served as the head football coach at the United States Naval Academy from 1904 to 1906, compiling a record of 25–5–4.  Dashiell played college football at Johns Hopkins University and at Lehigh University, and, in 1893, assisted Josh Hartwell in coaching football at Navy.  Dashiell taught chemistry and mathematics at the Naval Academy.  He died on July 7, 1937 at the Navy Hospital in Annapolis, Maryland.

Head coaching record

References

External links
 

1867 births
1937 deaths
19th-century players of American football
Johns Hopkins Blue Jays football players
Lehigh Mountain Hawks football players
Navy Midshipmen football coaches
St. John's Red Storm football players
United States Naval Academy faculty
United States Navy officers